Olympia is an unincorporated community in Bath County, Kentucky, United States. Olympia has a post office with ZIP code 40358.

References

Unincorporated communities in Bath County, Kentucky
Unincorporated communities in Kentucky